ProvideX is a computer language and development environment derived from Business Basic (a business oriented derivative of BASIC) in the mid-1980s.

ProvideX is available on several operating systems (Unix/Linux/Windows/Mac OS X) and includes not only the programming language but also file system, presentation layer interface, and other components.  The language is primarily designed for use in the development of business applications.

Over the years since its inception and as the computer industry has changed, ProvideX has added functionality such as a graphical interface, client-server capabilities, access to external databases, web services, and, more recently, object-oriented programming capabilities.

On October 8, 2010, PVX Plus Technologies announced that it has assumed all ongoing sales, development, and support of the ProvideX product line for Independent Software Vendors.  This brings the development of the language back under control of the original creator, Mike King and is the end result of almost 2 years of negotiations between Sage Group, EDIAS, and PVX Plus Technologies.

Syntax

Example Code

! This example code shows some ways to do the traditional hello world.
!
begin
   print 'CS', ! Clear Screen
   ! Plain Text
   print "Hello World!"

   ! Fonted Text (Error branch moves to next line if fonted text not available)
   print (0,err=*next)'Font'("Arial,-16,B"), ! Use Bold 16pt Arial Font
   print (0,err=*next)'Text'(@x(20),@y(2),"Hello World"),

   ! Move to the 2nd to last line on screen
   print @(3,mxl(0)-2),"Press Enter: ",
   input a$

   ! Message Box
   msgbox "Hello World"+sep+sep+"This is a test message box.","Message Box"
end

Notes
 ProvideX is a registered trademark of Sage Software Canada Ltd. a Subsidiary of Sage Software, Inc.

References

External links
 Sage Software Canada — As of October 8, 2010, now redirects to PVX Plus Technologies

BASIC compilers
Object-oriented programming languages
Procedural programming languages
BASIC programming language family
Programming languages created in 1992
Sage Group